William Edward Lori (born May 6, 1951) is an American prelate of the Catholic Church who has served as the 16th archbishop of the Archdiocese of Baltimore in Maryland since 2012. He was previously the fourth bishop of the Diocese of Bridgeport in Connecticut, and before that an auxiliary bishop of the Archdiocese of Washington D.C. He also serves as vice-president of the United States Conference of Catholic Bishops.

Biography

Education
William Lori was born in Louisville, Kentucky, on May 6, 1951 to Francis and Margaret Lori. He attended the Seminary of Saint Pius X in Erlanger, Kentucky, receiving a bachelor's degree in 1973. He earned an master's degree from Mount Saint Mary's Seminary in Emmitsburg, Maryland, in 1977.

Priestly ministry
Lori was ordained to the priesthood by Cardinal William Baum on May 14, 1977, for the Archdiocese of Washington. After his ordination, Lori served as a parochial vicar at St. Joseph Parish in Largo, Maryland, from 1977 until 1982. He earned a Doctor of Sacred Theology degree from the Catholic University of America in Washington, D.C. in 1982.  That same year, Lori became a theological advisor to Cardinal James Hickey, maintaining that role until 2000. Lori also served as the director of ecumenical affairs for the archdiocese from 1982 to 1986 and as Hickey's priest–secretary from 1983 until 1994. In 1994, Lori became the chancellor, vicar general, and moderator of the curia. In early 1995, Lori served as spokesman for the archdiocese when it removed four priests from ministry after they confessed to sexually abusing an altar boy years earlier.

Auxiliary Bishop of Washington
On February 25, 1995, Pope John Paul II appointed Lori as an auxiliary bishop of the Archdiocese of Washington and titular bishop of Bulla.  He was ordained by Cardinal Hickey on April 20, 1995.

Hickey sent Lori in 1997 to investigate irregularities in a Georgetown parish.  The pastoral staff had allegedly used gender-neutral terms during mass and criticized the male-only priesthood.  Lori interviewed dozens of parishioners under oath, leaving many of them unhappy with the experience.

Bishop of Bridgeport 
On January 23, 2001, John Paul II appointed Lori as bishop of the Diocese of Bridgeport; he was installed on March 19, 2001. As bishop, Lori launched new initiatives in catholic education, vocations, Catholic Charities, pastoral services, and other ministries

In 2002, Lori participated in writing the Dallas Charter. The initial draft applied to clerics, which includes bishops, priests, and deacons. The revised draft mentioned only priests and deacons. When questioned why the revised draft omitted bishops, Lori said that the drafting committee "decided we would limit it to priests and deacons, as the disciplining of bishops is beyond the purview of this document. 'Cleric' would cover all three, so we decided not to use the word "cleric.'"

While serving in Bridgeport, Lori refused to release the names of diocesan priests who were being sued for sexual abuse, part of the Sexual abuse scandal in Bridgeport diocese. The US Supreme Court ruled against Lori in 2009 and the diocese was forced to release them.

Archbishop of Baltimore 
On March 20, 2012, Lori was appointed archbishop of the Archdiocese of Baltimore by Pope Benedict XVI; Lori was installed on May 16, 2012. In January 2019, Lori released “The Journey to Racial Justice: Repentance, Healing and Action.”  The document acknowledged racism in the Catholic Church and suggested measures to combat it. In January 2019, Lori instituted an initiative for reporting allegations against any bishop in the archdiocese. The policy was drafted by the archdiocesan Independent Review Board.

Lori was appointed apostolic administrator in September 2018 of the Diocese of Wheeling-Charleston, following the retirement of Bishop Michael J. Bransfield.  Lori headed an investigation into allegations that Bransfield had engaged in sexual harassment and made inappropriate financial transactions. In June, 2019, the Washington Post obtained copies of the first and final drafts of that report. The names of several cardinals and bishops who had received payments from Bransfield were omitted in the final version, including that of Lori himself. When this news became public, Lori returned his $7,500 contribution from Bransfield back to the Diocese of Wheeling-Charleston, asking that they donate it to Catholic Charities. Other bishops followed his example. Lori admitted to the Baltimore Sun newspaper that he removed the names from the final report, stating later “looking back on this in hindsight, I would say that judgment call was a mistake.”

Memberships
 Chancellor and chair of the board, St. Mary's Seminary and University in Baltimore
 Chancellor, Mount St. Mary's Seminary
 Former board chair, The Catholic University of America
 Former board chair, Sacred Heart University in Fairfield, Connecticut
 Former chair and current member, USCCB Committee on Doctrine
 Former chair, USCCB Ad Hoc Committee for Religious Liberty
 Chair, USCCB Ad Hoc Committee on Universities and Colleges
 Member, USCCB Committee on Pro–Life Activities
 Member, USCCB Ad Hoc Committee for the Defense of Marriage
 Former member, USCCB Ad Hoc Committee on Sexual Abuse
 Former member, USCCB Committee on Catholic Education
 Supreme chaplain of the Knights of Columbus since 2005

See also

 Catholic Church in the United States
 Historical list of the Catholic bishops of the United States
 List of Catholic bishops of the United States
 Lists of patriarchs, archbishops, and bishops

References

External links
Biography, Diocese of Baltimore
Diocese of Bridgeport
Catholic-Hierarchy.org
Knights of Columbus Biography
Archdiocese of Baltimore

Episcopal succession

1951 births
Living people
Roman Catholic archbishops of Baltimore
Roman Catholic bishops of Bridgeport
Mount St. Mary's University alumni
People from Bridgeport, Connecticut
Catholic University of America alumni
21st-century Roman Catholic archbishops in the United States